is a Japanese football player.

Playing career
Kubo was born in Kagoshima Prefecture on June 22, 2001. He joined J1 League club FC Tokyo from youth team in 2018.

References

External links

2001 births
Living people
Association football people from Kagoshima Prefecture
Japanese footballers
J1 League players
J3 League players
FC Tokyo players
FC Tokyo U-23 players
Association football forwards